Phạm Thị Diễm (born 24 January 1990 in Thạnh Phú, Bến Tre) is a Vietnamese high jumper.

She won the bronze medals at the 2011 Southeast Asian Games and the 2013 Southeast Asian Games, finished ninth at the 2013 Asian Championships, seventh at the 2014 Asian Games and won the silver medal at the 2015 Southeast Asian Games.

Her personal best jump is 1.91 metres, achieved in May 2013 in Taipei.

References

1990 births
Living people
Vietnamese female high jumpers
Athletes (track and field) at the 2014 Asian Games
Southeast Asian Games medalists in athletics
Southeast Asian Games silver medalists for Vietnam
Southeast Asian Games bronze medalists for Vietnam
Competitors at the 2011 Southeast Asian Games
Competitors at the 2013 Southeast Asian Games
Competitors at the 2015 Southeast Asian Games
Asian Games competitors for Vietnam
Competitors at the 2019 Southeast Asian Games
21st-century Vietnamese women
Competitors at the 2021 Southeast Asian Games